Jasaw Chan Kʼawiil I also known as Ruler A, Ah Cacao and Sky Rain (before 682-734), was an ajaw of the Maya city of Tikal. He took the throne on May 3, 682, and reigned until his death.

Biography
Before advances in the decipherment of the Maya script revealed this reading of his name, this ruler was also known to researchers as Tikal Ruler A, Jasaw Chan Kʼawiil or by the nickname Ah Cacao.

One of the most celebrated of Tikal's rulers, Jasaw Chan Kʼawiil's reign came at the end of a 130-year-long hiatus in Tikal's historical record, and his defeat of the rival Maya city of Calakmul in 695 is seen to represent a resurgence in the strength and influence of Tikal.

Two structures at Tikal in particular are associated with Jasaw Chan Kʼawiil. Tikal Temple I is a classically Petén-styled stepped pyramid structure which served as this ruler's tomb, although it is unclear whether it was built for this specific purpose. Tikal Temple II served as the tomb for his wife, Lady Lahan Unen Moʼ (died c.704).  His successor was his son Yikʼin Chan Kʼawiil.

Notes

Footnotes

References

Rulers of Tikal
7th century in the Maya civilization
8th century in the Maya civilization
7th-century monarchs in North America
8th-century monarchs in North America
7th-century births
734 deaths
7th century in Guatemala
8th century in Guatemala